Riley Wang (born March 18, 1996) is a Canadian actor, singer and DJ. He was a member of the Taiwanese boyband SpeXial from 2015 to 2017.

Biography 
Riley Wang was born in Taiwan, on March 18, 1996. His family emigrated to Canada when he was ten years old, where he spent most of his teen years. In 2012, Wang was ranked second in a modeling contest in Vancouver. In the second half of 2014, he joined the Taiwanese boy band SpeXial alongside two other new members. He debuted in SpeXial under his English name of "Riley" on January 13, 2015.

He debuted as an actor in 2017, playing the main role in the web series Long For You. He has also appeared in web series like Attention, Love!, Long For You 2, and I Hear You. 

On August 25, 2017, Wang announced that he was going to leave SpeXial after his contract was rescinded due to "different career objectives." His departure from the group took place that same day. After his departure, SpeXial became a group of nine members.

Personal life

Social media presence 
In opposition to his Weibo and Instagram updates, Wang takes to Twitter with an informal side with his small audience, which consist of him tweeting primarily in English (with the occasion of not to promote other SNS posts), posting memes frequently, and giving insight as an actor or fanboying over Kpop, notably the girl group Twice.

Filmography

Film

Television series

Discography

References

External links 

 Official web site

1996 births
Living people
Taiwanese male television actors
21st-century Taiwanese male actors
21st-century Taiwanese  male singers
Taiwanese pop singers
Taiwanese idols